Veldon Simpson is an architect. He designed the Luxor Hotel in Las Vegas, Nevada, as well as the MGM Grand and Excalibur Hotel and Casino. He is the president of the Veldon Simpson-Architect, Inc., which formed as a corporation in 1976.

References

American architects
Living people
Year of birth missing (living people)